Lectionary 173, designated by siglum ℓ 173 (in the Gregory-Aland numbering) is a Greek manuscript of the New Testament, on parchment leaves. Paleographically it has been assigned to the 10th century. 
Formerly it was labelled as Lectionary 73a. Scrivener by 54a.

Description 

The codex contains Lessons from the Acts and Epistles lectionary (Apostolarion), on 178 parchment leaves (25.2 cm by 19.3 cm). The text is written in Greek minuscule letters, in two columns per page, 18 lines per page.

History 

The manuscript was examined by Eduard de Muralt and Gregory.

The manuscript is not cited in the critical editions of the Greek New Testament (UBS3), but it was used for the Editio Critica Maior.

Currently the codex is located in the National Library of Russia (Gr. 57) at Saint Petersburg.

See also 

 List of New Testament lectionaries
 Biblical manuscript
 Textual criticism

Notes and references 

Greek New Testament lectionaries
10th-century biblical manuscripts